The men's individual archery event at the 1976 Summer Olympics was part of the archery programme. The event consisted of a double FITA round. For each round, the archer shot 36 arrows at each of four distances—90, 50, 70, and 30 metres. The highest score for each arrow was 10 points, giving a possible maximum of 2880 points. 23 nations sent 37 archers to the men's competition.

The American men placed first and second in the first round, as Darrell Pace missed the Olympic record set by fellow American John Williams in 1972 by only 4 points.  In the second round, Pace improved his score by 43 points, smashing both the single and double FITA round records as he won gold.  Richard McKinney fell to fourth place in the final rankings, however, as Hiroshi Michinaga of Japan and Giancarlo Ferrari of Italy surged forward to grab the silver and bronze medals, respectively.

Records

The following new Olympic records were set during this competition.

Results

References

External links
Official Olympic Report

M
Men's events at the 1976 Summer Olympics